Enagnon David Kiki (born 25 November 1993) is a Beninese professional footballer who plays for Liga I side Farul Constanța and the Benin national team. A left-sided player, Kiki has played in both defence and midfield.

Career
Between 2012 and 2015, Kiki played in the Championnat de France amateur with Belfort, making 52 league appearances in total for the club. He joined Ligue 2 club Chamois Niortais ahead of the 2015–16 season, and made his debut in the 0–0 draw away at Évian Thonon Gaillard on 21 August 2015.

In January 2019, he was loaned to Red Star from Brest.

Kiki won his first international cap for Benin on 14 June 2015, in a 1–1 draw with Equatorial Guinea. He played at the 2019 Africa Cup of Nations where the team reached the quarter-finals.

Career statistics

Club

International

References

1993 births
Living people
People from Ouémé Department
Beninese footballers
Benin international footballers
Association football defenders
Association football midfielders
ASM Belfort players
Championnat National 2 players
Championnat National 3 players
Chamois Niortais F.C. players
Stade Brestois 29 players
Red Star F.C. players
FC Montana players
Ligue 2 players
First Professional Football League (Bulgaria) players
FC Arda Kardzhali players
Liga I players
FCV Farul Constanța players
Beninese expatriate footballers
Expatriate footballers in France
Expatriate footballers in Bulgaria
Expatriate footballers in Romania
Beninese expatriate sportspeople in France
Beninese expatriate sportspeople in Bulgaria
Beninese expatriate sportspeople in Romania

2019 Africa Cup of Nations players